Dolany is a municipality and village in Náchod District in the Hradec Králové Region of the Czech Republic. It has about 700 inhabitants.

Administrative parts
Villages of Čáslavky, Krabčice, Sebuč and Svinišťany are administrative parts of Dolany.

References

Villages in Náchod District